The 1985 MTV Video Music Awards aired live on September 13, 1985, honoring the best music videos from May 2, 1984, to May 1, 1985. The show was hosted by Eddie Murphy at the Radio City Music Hall in New York City.

Don Henley was the night's biggest winner, taking home four Moonmen, including Video of the Year.  In fact, his video for "The Boys of Summer" was also the year's most nominated video, receiving seven nominations in total.  Meanwhile, David Lee Roth turned out to be the most nominated artist that night, receiving eight nominations for two of his videos:  five for "Just a Gigolo/I Ain't Got Nobody" and three for "California Girls."  Nevertheless, Roth came out of the ceremony empty-handed that night.

Other major nominees included Lindsey Buckingham, Bryan Adams, Eurythmics, Madonna, and Tom Petty and the Heartbreakers. Buckingham tied with Don Henley with seven nominations:  three for "Slow Dancing" and four for "Go Insane."  Right after him came six-time nominee Adams, who received five nominations for "Run to You" and one for "Heaven."  Lastly, Madonna, Eurythmics, and Petty received five nominations apiece:  Madonna split her nominations between "Like a Virgin" (three) and "Material Girl" (two), while Tom Petty and Eurythmics received all five nominations for "Don't Come Around Here No More" and "Would I Lie to You?," respectively.

Background
In June 1985, MTV announced that the 1985 Video Music Awards would be held on September 13 at Radio City Music Hall. Preliminary nominees with 10 videos per category were announced in mid-July before the final set of nominees were announced at a press conference at New York's Hard Rock Cafe on August 13. Eddie Murphy was announced as the ceremony's host in mid-July.

Performances

Presenters
 Sheila E. and Paul Young – presented Best Overall Performance in a Video
 Run-DMC – rapped the eligibility and voting rules for the VMAs
 Foreigner (Mick Jones and Lou Gramm) – presented Best Stage Performance in a Video
 Bryan Adams and Jim Kerr – presented Best New Artist in a Video
 The Cars (Benjamin Orr and Elliot Easton) – presented Most Experimental Video
 Martha Quinn – introduced the presentations of the professional categories
 Mark Goodman – announced the winner of Best Art Direction in a Video
 Alan Hunter – announced the winner of Best Cinematography in a Video
 Nina Blackwood – announced the winners of Best Special Effects in a Video
 J. J. Jackson – announced the winner of Best Editing in a Video
 Julian Lennon and Corey Hart – presented Best Choreography in a Video
 Morris Day – presented Best Concept Video
 John Taylor and Andy Taylor – presented Video Vanguard to Russell Mulcahy
 Chrissie Hynde – presented Video Vanguard to David Byrne
 Herbie Hancock – presented Video Vanguard to Godley & Creme
 Glenn Frey – presented Best Direction in a Video
 Joan Baez – presented the Special Recognition Award
 Don Henley – presented Best Group Video
 Aimee Mann and Stephen Pearcy – presented Viewer's Choice
 Grace Jones – presented Best Male Video
 David Lee Roth – presented Best Female Video
 Tina Turner – presented Video of the Year

Winners and nominees
Winners are listed first and highlighted in bold.

Other appearances
 Little Steven – accepted the Best Stage Performance award on behalf of Bruce Springsteen
 Lou Reed – appeared in a video package about the year's new artists
 Kris P. – accepted the Best Editing award on behalf of Zbigniew Rybczyński
 Dave Stewart – accepted the Best Choreography award on behalf of Elton John
 John Sayles – accepted the Best Male Video award on behalf of Bruce Springsteen

References

External links
Official MTV site

1985
MTV Video Music Awards
MTV Video Music Awards